The Worshipful Company of Information Technologists, also known as the Information Technologists' Company, is one of the livery companies of the City of London. The company was granted livery status by the Court of Aldermen on 7 January 1992, becoming the 100th livery company. It received its Royal Charter on 17 June 2010 from Prince Edward.

Overview
The company has over 800 members – all currently or formerly senior practitioners in the information technology industry. The Information Technologists' Company is unusual for a 'modern' (post 1926) livery company in that it has its own hall. The hall is located on Bartholomew Close, near to Barbican tube station, and was bought largely thanks to the generosity of Dame Stephanie Shirley and others. Prominent members of the company include Tim Berners-Lee, Vint Cerf, Sherry Coutu, Bill Gates, Tom Ilube, Mike Lynch, Ken Olisa, David Wootton, Dame Stephanie Shirley CH and several past Presidents of BCS, The Chartered Institute for IT, including Dame Stephanie.

The company ranks 100th in the order of precedence for the City livery companies. Its motto is Cito, meaning 'swiftly' in Latin, a word which also incorporates the initials of the Company of Information Technologists.

The company is a member of the Financial Services Group of Livery Companies, the other twelve members of which are the Chartered Accountants, Chartered Surveyors, Actuaries, Arbitrators, International Bankers, Chartered Secretaries and Administrators, Insurers, Solicitors, Management Consultants, Marketors, Tax Advisers, and World Traders.

Activities 
The company has a significant charitable and educational programme which uses the expertise, resources and networks of its members, and it is also involved in a range of activities to promote the information technology profession.
The four pillars of the company are charity, education, fellowship and industry.

The company has a number of panels through which activities are organised. It is probably unique amongst Livery Companies in having an Ethical and Spiritual Development Panel, which considers such topics as the ethical and spiritual implications of the Internet – running colloquia on that topic in the House of Lords as far back as 1997.

Working with charities
Getting the maximum benefit from IT is now a pre-requisite, not just for commercial organisations but also for the charity sector. The company works with a wide range of non-profit organisations with the aim of helping them to gain the maximum benefit from their IT. Members give their time and expertise to provide pro-bono IT advice (usually at a strategic level). In addition, iT4Communities is the national IT volunteering programme, introducing volunteer IT professionals to charities needing IT help and support. iT4C was set up by the Worshipful Company in 2002 and since then has registered over 5,000 volunteers and more than 2,500 charities. iT4C has delivered over £3 million worth of support to the charity sector thanks to the work of the dedicated volunteer IT professionals.

Education
For hundreds of years, livery companies have supported schools in London and across the United Kingdom. Currently, the Worshipful Company of Information Technologists has a partnership with Lilian Baylis Technology School in Lambeth. Previous projects include HOLNET (the History of London on the Internet), which is now incorporated into the London Grid for Learning. In 2011, together with the Worshipful Company of Mercers (the premier livery company), they opened Hammersmith Academy.

IT profession
With members coming from all sectors of the IT field, the company can provide a neutral meeting ground for discussion of issues that are central to both the profession and the City of London. It also runs a Journeyman Scheme which supports young IT professionals in the early stages of their career.

Support to the armed forces
The company is affiliated with the Royal Corps of Signals, the Joint Forces Cyber Group and HMS Collingwood.

It is also affiliated with 46F (Kensington) Squadron, Air Training Corps, and Beckenham and Penge Sea Cadets.

List of recent Masters

Company chaplain
Father Marcus Walker

Arms

References

External links
 Worshipful Company of Information Technologists website
 Facebook page of the Worshipful Company of Information Technologists
 Twitter account of the Worshipful Company of Information Technologists

1992 establishments in England
Computer science education in the United Kingdom
Information technology organisations based in the United Kingdom
Information Technologists
Organizations established in 1992